Sitiveni P. Kaufusi (born October 17, 1963 in Nukuʻalofa, Tonga) is a former American football defensive lineman in the National Football League for the Philadelphia Eagles from 1988-1990.

College career
Kaufusi also played college football at Brigham Young University and attended junior college at Dixie State College (now known as Utah Tech University.)

Coaching career
Most recently, Kaufusi was defensive-line coach at Brigham Young University, stepping down in January 2018. He played a key role in recruiting Polynesian players to BYU. Kaufusi was one of just a few Tongans coaching in Division I football.

Personal life
Kaufusi's three sons, Bronson, Corbin, and Devin all played college football for the BYU Cougars. Devin also played football for the University of Utah. Bronson and Corbin both played for the BYU basketball team as well. His wife, Michelle Kaufusi is currently mayor of Provo, Utah.

References

1963 births
American football defensive linemen
BYU Cougars football players
Living people
Philadelphia Eagles players
Tongan emigrants to the United States
Tongan players of American football
Utah Tech Trailblazers football players
People from Nukuʻalofa